Operating costs or operational costs, are the expenses which are related to the operation of a business, or to the operation of a device, component, piece of equipment or facility. They are the cost of resources used by an organization just to maintain its existence. http://www.operatingcosts.com

Business operating costs  
For a commercial enterprise, operating costs fall into three broad categories:
 fixed costs, which are the same whether the operation is closed or running at 100% capacity. Fixed Costs include items such as the rent of the building. These generally have to be paid regardless of what state the business is in. It never changes
 variable costs, which may increase depending on whether more production is done, and how it is done (producing 100 items of product might require 10 days of normal time or take 7 days if overtime is used.  It may be more or less expensive to use overtime production depending on whether faster production means the product can be more profitable). Variable Costs include indirect overhead costs such as Cell Phone Services, Computer Supplies, Credit Card Processing, Electrical use, Express Mail, Janitorial Supplies, MRO, Office Products, Payroll Services, Telecom, Uniforms, Utilities, or  Waste Disposal etc.
semi variable, the expenses necessary to keep the business in proper condition.

Business overhead costs 
Overhead costs for a business are the cost of resources used by an organization just to maintain its existence. Overhead costs are usually measured in monetary terms, but non-monetary overhead is possible in the form of time required to accomplish tasks.

Examples of overhead costs include:
payment of rent on the office space a business occupies
cost of electricity for the office lights
some office personnel wages

Non-overhead costs are incremental such as the cost of raw materials used in the goods a business sells.

Operating Cost is calculated by Cost of goods sold + Operating Expenses.
Operating Expenses consist of :
 Administrative and office expenses like rent, salaries, to staff, insurance, directors fees etc.
 Selling and distribution expenses like advertisement, salaries of salesmen.
It includes all operating cost such as salary, rent, stationery, furniture etc.

Equipment operating costs
In the case of a device, component, piece of equipment or facility (for the rest of this article, all of these items will be referred to in general as equipment), it is the regular, usual and customary recurring costs of operating the equipment. This does not include the capital cost of constructing or purchasing the equipment (depending on whether it is made by the owner or was purchased as a constructed system).

Operating costs are incurred by all equipment — unless the equipment has no cost to operate, requires no personnel or space and never wears out. In some cases, equipment may appear to have low or no operating cost because either the cost is not recognized or is being absorbed in whole or part by the cost of something else.

Equipment operating costs may include:
 Salaries or Wages of personnel
 Advertising
 Raw materials
 License or equivalent fees (such as Corporation yearly registration fees) imposed by a government
 Real estate expenses, including 
Rent or Lease payments
Office space rent
furniture and equipment
investment value of the funds used to purchase the land, if it is owned instead of rented or leased
property taxes and equivalent assessments
Operations taxes, such as fees assessed on transportation carriers for use of highways
 Fuel costs such as power for operations, fuel for production
 Public Utilities such as telephone service, Internet connectivity, etc.
 Maintenance of equipment 
 Office supplies and consumables
 Insurance premium
 Depreciation of equipment and eventual replacement costs (unless the facility has no moving parts it probably will wear out eventually)
 Damage due to uninsured losses, accident, sabotage, negligence, terrorism and routine wear and tear.
 Taxes on production or operation (such as subsidence fees imposed on oil wells)
 Income taxes

Some of these are not applicable in all instances.  For example, 
A solar panel placed on one's home for use in generating electric power generally has only capital costs; once it's running there are no personnel costs, utility costs or depreciation and it uses no extra land (that wasn't already part of the place where it is located) so it has no real operating costs; however there may need to be taken into account costs of replacement if damaged.
An automobile or any other item purchased for personal use has no salary cost because the owner does not charge themselves for operating the device.
An item which is leased may have some or all of these costs included as part o
It might be questionable to assert that the cost of ten extra people on the sales force are an incremental cost or an overhead cost, since the wages for these people are both overhead and incremental. The staff needed to keep the shop operational are mostly considered overhead.
formula for operating cost = total cost* number of weeks

References
 Rituraj Shrivastava SP Gupta, Ajay Sharma, Satish Ahuja. Cost Accounting. FK Publications. pg. 316

Business terms